James Leslie Herbert Savage  (1 July 1936 – 20 February 2023) was a New Zealand Paralympic athletics competitor.  He won bronze medals at the 1972 and 1976 Summer Paralympics in the shot put 3 event.

In the 1977 New Year Honours, Savage was appointed a Member of the Order of the British Empire, for services to paraplegics and sport.

Savage died on 20 February 2023, at the age of 86.

References

External links
 
 

1936 births
2023 deaths
Paralympic athletes of New Zealand
Athletes (track and field) at the 1972 Summer Paralympics
Paralympic bronze medalists for New Zealand
Wheelchair shot putters
Place of birth missing (living people)
New Zealand Members of the Order of the British Empire
Medalists at the 1972 Summer Paralympics
Medalists at the 1976 Summer Paralympics
Paralympic medalists in athletics (track and field)
New Zealand male shot putters
Paralympic shot putters
20th-century New Zealand people